Elegia inconspicuella is a species of snout moth in the genus Elegia. It was described by Ragonot in 1888. It is found in South Africa.

References

Endemic moths of South Africa
Moths described in 1888
Phycitini